Maraba may refer to:
 Marabá, Pará, a municipality (município) in the state of Pará in Brazil
 Marabá Paulista, a municipality in the state of São Paulo in Brazil
 Maraba, Rwanda, a location in southern Rwanda
 Maraba Coffee, a fairtrade coffee produced in the Maraba area of Rwanda
Maraba, Nasarawa state, the border between Abuja and nasarawa state Nigeria